Cypaera or Kypaira or Cyphara or Cyphaera (Κύφαιρα) was a town and polis (city-state) of Ancient Thessaly, in the southern part of the district Thessaliotis or Phthiotis, near the confines of Dolopia. Livy relates that the retreat of Philip V of Macedon after the Battle of the Aous (198 BC) allowed the Aetolians to occupy much of Thessaly, and these latter, after sacking Xyniae took Cypaera. It has been located at a site called Palaia Yannitsou within the territory between the modern villages of Kaitsa (Λουτρά Καΐτσης) and Makrirrachi (Μακρυρράχη), in the municipal unit of Xyniada.

References

Cities in ancient Greece
Populated places in ancient Thessaly
Former populated places in Greece
Thessaliotis
Achaea Phthiotis
Thessalian city-states